PM Selfiewallie is a 2018 Hindi web series, created by Ekta Kapoor for her video on demand platform ALTBalaji. The web series is about an NRI fashionista who accidentally becomes the PM of India.

The series is available for streaming on the ALT Balaji App and its associated websites since its release date.

Plot
The series revolves around Tanya Thakur (Nityaami Shirke) who is born and raised in London. Tanya is a popular NRI Fashion blogger whose first ever visit turns into a crazy adventure when she gets kidnapped. Later she learns that she is supposed to be the youngest Prime Minister of the largest democracy of the world. The show explores whether Tanya could take the massive responsibilities to lead the country to greatness or whether she fails.

Cast
 Nityaami Shirke as Tanya Thakur
 Seema Banerjee as Priyamvada Thakur
 Ramakant Dayama as Ashok
 Pranay Panchauri as Sachin Ghatge
 Anjali Sivaraman as Meera
 Paras Zuteh as Ricky
 Shanna Groverr as Riyaaz
 Adithi Kalkunte as Aruna
 Sandeep as Arnab Oswami
 Nazneen Madan as Amrita Bansal
 Alad Hussein as Subramanium Swamy
 Deepak Kriplani as Prasad
 Pradeep Chaudhary as Patel
 Archana Patel as Mrs. Treasurewala
 Debashish Mitra as Godang Garam
 Rajeev Singh as Sarpanch
 Bobby Parvez as Pakistan PM
 Harish as Sri Lankan PM
 Samay Thakkar as Bangladesh PM
 Baldev Trehan as President
 Kadam Mehta as Swamy
 Mona Mathew as Female News Reporter
 Pravesh as Male News Reporter

List of episodes
 Episode 1: And The Job of a Lifetime...
 Episode 2: And The Best Selfie Ever...
 Episode 3: And Love Thy Neighbor...
 Episode 4: And Force The Neighbor to Love You...
 Episode 5: And Its Time to Create History...
 Episode 6: And The Coming Out Party...
 Episode 7: Season Finale: And The High Hook-Up...

References

External links
 Watch PM Selfiewallie on ALT Balaji website

2018 web series debuts
Hindi-language web series
ALTBalaji original programming
Indian comedy web series
Works about Indian politics